The Projapygidae are a family of hexapods in the order Diplura.

Genera
 Biclavula San Martín, 1963
 Pentacladiscus San Martín, 1963
 Projapyx Cook, 1899
 Symphylurinus Silvestri, 1909

References

Diplura
Arthropod families